Oleh Valeriyovych Protasov (born 4 February 1964) is a Ukrainian and Soviet former footballer who played as a striker. He was a key member of the Soviet Union national team throughout the 1980s; his 28 goals for the Soviet Union are second in the team's history, behind Oleh Blokhin's 42. It should be considered that his first name is often spelled as Oleg on most of international rosters, particularly during his playing career.

Between October 2014 and March 2015, he was the head coach of Romanian club Astra Giurgiu.

Playing career

Club
Oleh Protasov started playing football at the age of 8 years old in his hometown of Dnipropetrovsk in Dnipro Dnipropetrovsk, where he played until 1987. In 1987, Protasov moved to play for the Soviet-Ukrainian football giants, Dynamo Kyiv. In all, in the Soviet Union, he won the Soviet Championship twice and was named Soviet Footballer of the Year in 1987. He scored 125 goals in the Soviet Championship, making him the 8th best scorer of all-time of the Championship.

Following the fall of the Soviet Union, Oleh Protasov got a chance to play abroad. In 1990, he joined Greek side Olympiacos Piraeus. Leaving Olympiacos in 1994, he played in Gamba Osaka, Veria FC, and finally Proodeftiki FC, from where he retired in 1999.

International
Protasov played for the Soviet Union 68 times, including at the 1986 and 1990 FIFA World Cups, as well as Euro 88, where he scored two goals. He also played one game for the Ukraine national team, in 1994.

In 1983, Protasov took part in the Summer Spartakiad of the Peoples of the USSR, representing the Ukrainian SSR.

Coaching career
After retiring as a player, Protasov went into coaching, and led Olympiacos Piraeus to the Greek title in 2003. In 2005, he coached Romanian team Steaua București.

Dnipro Dnipropetrovsk
In December 2005, Oleh Protasov returned in Ukraine to coach his hometown team, Dnipro Dnipropetrovsk, after an impressive UEFA Cup performance with Steaua București. Protasov left by his own choice and was on very good terms with the entire team and owners of the club.

In his first 2005–06 season as Dnipro Dnipropetrovsk's coach, Oleh Protasov led the team to a 6th-place finish in the Ukrainian Premier League. In the next, 2006–07 season, Protasov improved on this, finishing 4th in the league.

In the 2007–08 season his side unexpectedly led the title race ahead of the winter break, before a poor second half left his side in 4th once again. Dnipro sacked him on 29 August 2008 after an embarrassing defeat from AC Bellinzona in UEFA cup qualification match.

Kuban Krasnodar
After that, Protasov took over FC Kuban Krasnodar in the nearby region of Russia. Kuban had been recently relegated to the Russian First League. Under Protasov's leadership, the club finished 2nd in the league, with an 8-point lead over their nearest competitors. This finish earned them right to be promoted to the Russian Premier League.

However FC Kuban was hard-hit by the global financial crisis of 2008–2009, which greatly decreased the club's budget. In a mutual agreement with the club, Protasov left the club on 19 November 2008.

Iraklis Thessaloniki
Then, he signed a two-year deal worth 400,000 euro per year with Iraklis Thessaloniki, starting from the summer of 2009. On 30 October, it was announced by Iraklis F.C. the termination of their contract, after 5 continual defeats in Super League and Greek Cup.

Astra Giurgiu
On 13 October 2014, Oleg became manager of FC Astra Giurgiu. He was sacked on 2 March 2015.

Aris Thessaloniki
Protasov agreed on a three years contract with Aris Thessaloniki, though Arvanitidis expel from head of football department position of the club, led to amateur Aris to terminate the deal after 15 minutes of its announcement.

Honours

Club
Dnipro Dnipropetrovsk	
Soviet Top League: 1983
USSR Federation Cup: 1986

Dynamo Kyiv	
Soviet Top League: 1990
Soviet Cup: 1989–90OlympiacosGreek Cup: 1991–92

 International Soviet Union'''
UEFA European Championship: Runner-up 1988

Individual
Soviet Footballer of the Year: 1987
Soviet Top League top scorer (3): 1985, 1987, 1990
UEFA Silver Boot: 1984

Career statistics

Club

International

International goals

Personal
Protasov is married to Natalia (née – Lemeshko), a daughter of Yevhen Lemeshko. He is a naturalised citizen of Greece and is able to speak Greek, alongside English, Russian and his native Ukrainian.

References

External links
 Info on Dnipro official website (in list)
 Oleh Protasov at Kopanyi-Myach.info 
 

1964 births
Living people
Footballers from Dnipro
Soviet footballers
Soviet Union international footballers
Soviet expatriate footballers
Ukrainian emigrants to Greece
Naturalized citizens of Greece
Ukrainian footballers
Ukraine international footballers
Ukrainian expatriate footballers
Expatriate footballers in Greece
Expatriate footballers in Japan
Soviet expatriate sportspeople in Greece
Ukrainian expatriate sportspeople in Greece
Ukrainian expatriate sportspeople in Japan
Ukrainian football managers
Soviet Top League players
FC Dnipro players
FC Dynamo Kyiv players
Olympiacos F.C. players
Super League Greece players
Gamba Osaka players
Veria F.C. players
Proodeftiki F.C. players
1986 FIFA World Cup players
UEFA Euro 1988 players
1990 FIFA World Cup players
Association football forwards
J1 League players
Dual internationalists (football)
Olympiacos F.C. managers
Expatriate football managers in Cyprus
Super League Greece managers
Expatriate football managers in Greece
AEL Limassol managers
FC Steaua București managers
FC Dnipro managers
Ukrainian Premier League managers
FC Kuban Krasnodar managers
FC Rostov managers
Iraklis Thessaloniki F.C. managers
Russian Premier League managers
FC Astana managers
Veria F.C. managers
FC Dinamo Minsk managers
FC Astra Giurgiu managers
Ukrainian expatriate football managers
Expatriate football managers in Russia
Expatriate football managers in Belarus
Expatriate football managers in Romania
Expatriate football managers in Kazakhstan
Ukrainian expatriate sportspeople in Russia
Ukrainian expatriate sportspeople in Belarus
Ukrainian expatriate sportspeople in Romania
Ukrainian expatriate sportspeople in Kazakhstan
Football Federation of Ukraine officials
Recipients of the Order of Merit (Ukraine), 3rd class